Nikola-Koren is a rural locality (a selo) in Ustyanskoye Rural Settlement, Ust-Kubinsky District, Vologda Oblast, Russia. The population was 139 as of 2002. There are 4 streets.

Geography 
Nikola-Koren is located 10 km northwest of Ustye (the district's administrative centre) by road. Gomanikha is the nearest rural locality.

References 

Rural localities in Ust-Kubinsky District